Shiokaze may refer to:
 Shiokaze (train), a train service in Japan
 Shiokaze (broadcast), one of international radio programs of Japan
 Japanese destroyer Shiokaze, a Minekaze class destroyer of Imperial Japanese Navy
 Shiokaze, the name of the train on the Mojikō Retro Scenic Line